Albert Joseph "Mickey" Kreitner (October 10, 1922 – March 6, 2003) was a  Major League Baseball catcher who played for the Chicago Cubs during the 1943 and 1944 seasons. Listed at 6' 3", 190 lb., he batted and threw right handed.

As a 20-year-old rookie in 1943, Kreitner was the tenth youngest player to appear in a National League game. He was a typical example of what veteran catcher Mike González termed "good field, no hit" player.

Kreitner was one of many ballplayers who only appeared in the major leagues during World War II. He debuted with the Cubs on September 28, 1943 in a home doubleheader against the New York Giants at Wrigley Field.

In a 42-game career, Kreitner posted a batting average of .172 (16-for-93), which included 14 singles and two doubles, scoring three runs while driving in three more. In limited playing time he had good numbers as a catcher, handling 126 out of 127 chances successfully for a solid .992 fielding percentage.

Kreitner died in his hometown of Nashville, Tennessee, at the age of 80, following complications from cancer.

External links

Retrosheet entry

Major League Baseball catchers
Chicago Cubs players
Americus Pioneers players
Los Angeles Angels (minor league) players
Nashville Vols players
Baseball players from Nashville, Tennessee
1922 births
2003 deaths